"It's Over" is a 1966 song written and originally performed by Jimmie Rodgers. He released it as a single in 1966, with "Anita, You're Dreaming" on the flip side.

Jimmie Rodgers recalled:

Track listing

Jimmie Rodgers version 
7" single (1966)
 "It's Over" 2:37
 "Anita, You're Dreaming" (2:30)

Charts

Jimmie Rodgers version

Cover versions
Elvis Presley recorded a live version of "It's Over" at his January 14, 1973 televised concert special Aloha from Hawaii. The recording was first released on the LP Aloha from Hawaii. He also had recorded the song live (for RCA and MGM) in April 1972. Another live recording, from February 17, 1972, was released in 1995 on the box set Walk a Mile in My Shoes: The Essential '70s Masters.
The song has also been covered by Glen Campbell (in 1967), Dusty Springfield, Sonny James and Billie Davis.
In his 1970 release, Scott Walker released the song on the album, 'Til the Band Comes In.

References

External links 
 Jimmie Rodgers - It's Over / Anita, You're Dreaming at Discogs

1966 songs
1966 singles
Jimmie Rodgers (pop singer) songs
Elvis Presley songs
Torch songs